Croydon Park may refer to:
Croydon Park, New South Wales, a suburb of Sydney
Croydon Park, South Australia, a suburb of Adelaide
Croydon Park Public School, A school in Croydon Park Sydney